Nicky van Leuveren (born 20 May 1990) is a Dutch sprinter. She competed in the 400 metres event at the 2014 IAAF World Indoor Championships.

References

External links
 

1990 births
Living people
Dutch female sprinters
Athletes from Amsterdam
Place of birth missing (living people)
Olympic athletes of the Netherlands
Athletes (track and field) at the 2016 Summer Olympics
Olympic female sprinters